The Noble M10 is the first car designed and produced by Noble Automotive. It was a two-door, two-seater model built in convertible form only. It is powered by a naturally aspirated 2.5-litre 168 hp engine. It was introduced in 1999, but is no longer in production, having been replaced by the M12. Only 6 cars were ever made as customers moved deposits onto the M12 as soon as its credentials were announced. The M10 is similar in performance to the Lotus Elise in many respects. The Toyota MR2 Spyder is noted for having a somewhat similar appearance to the M10. The first two cars were built at Lee Noble's home garage see Fenix Automotive.

Performance

0-60 mph (97 km/h) = 5.9 seconds
0-100 mph (161 km/h) = 16.9 seconds
-mile = 14.56 seconds
Top speed =

References

M10
First car made by manufacturer
Rear mid-engine, rear-wheel-drive vehicles
Sports cars
Convertibles
Cars introduced in 1999
2000s cars